Filinvest City, formerly Filinvest Corporate City, is a central business district situated within Muntinlupa, Metro Manila, Philippines.

History
The development of Filinvest City began in 1995, by Filinvest at the site of the former Alabang Stock Farm. Under the administration of President Fidel V. Ramos, the farm was opened for joint development with the private sector and the government-owned property was placed for bidding.  The Gotianuns acquired the farm after it bested the bids of companies of the Ayala and Gokongwei families in a government-organized bidding.
The project was started by the Filinvest Development Corporation (FDC) through its founder Andrew L. Gotianun Sr.

FDC established the Filinvest Alabang, Inc. on August 25, 1993, for the purpose of entering a joint agreement with the government to develop the farm. The development was earlier known as the Filinvest Corporate City but was rebranded as Filinvest City to reflect a shift of the area as a mixed-use development from a primarily commercial venture.

The master plan for Filinvest was revised in 2017 with the help of Singaporean firm AECOM. This led to the opening of the Spectrum Linear Park and the Northgate Cyberzone district cooling system, by early 2018.

Management
Filinvest City is developed and managed by Filinvest Alabang, Inc. which is a subsidiary of Filinvest Development Corporation and Filinvest Land Inc.. Under the joint agreement with the government, the FAI owned 74 percent stake in Filinvest City.

Residential areas
Among the residential settlements in Filinvest City include Botanika Nature Residence, Vivant Flats, La Vie Flats, and the Bristol at Parkway Place.

Developments
The central business district is divided into six divisions, namely City Center, Civic Plaza, Northgate Cyberzone, Westgate Center, Spectrum Business District, and The Palms Country Club. Key district areas in Filinvest City include the shopping centre Festival Alabang and public spaces like The River Park, Spectrum Linear Park, and the Filinvest City Event Grounds, the last of which has hosted the Wanderland Music and Arts Festival since 2017. The district is also accessible to the Alabang–Zapote Road and transportation services are available in South Station and Festival Mall.

See also
Araneta City
Bonifacio Global City
Makati Central Business District

References

Buildings and structures in Muntinlupa
Business parks of the Philippines